Edward Odom (born 1853) an American politician and barber.

He was first elected to the Alabama House of Representatives in 1872. His 1874 election as a legislator from Barbour County, and that of fellow state representatives Adam Gachet and A. E. Williams, were overturned in the house.

He testified about violent organized attacks on Republican voters in Eufaula, Alabama, arrests, jailings, and intimidation. He testified that Republican meetings were disrupted by Democrats and Republican leaders forced to leave the area due to threats.

See also
Election Riot of 1874
African-American officeholders during and following the Reconstruction era

References

1853 births
Barbers
People from Barbour County, Alabama
African-American state legislators in Alabama
Year of death missing